Max Cameron Hazeldine (born 13 February 1997) is an English footballer who plays as a striker for Trafford.

Career

In April 2015 Hazeldine was offered his first professional contract at Accrington Stanley having come through their youth system. He made his debut coming off the bench for Shay McCartan against Dagenham & Redbridge.

In January 2016, he joined Northern Premier League Premier Division side Skelmersdale United on an initial two-month loan deal. He signed for Marine on 23 November 2017.

Hazeldine signed for Marine on 25 November 2017. He then joined Northern Premier League Division One West side Clitheroe in July 2018 and made his debut against Accrington Stanley XI. He signed his contract on 17 November 2018. He joined Northern Premier League Division One North-West side Colne in the summer of 2019, being one of the clubs first signings. On 17 December 2019, he left the club by mutual consent. He then joined divisional rivals Trafford later in the month.

Career statistics

References

External links
 

1997 births
People from Stockport
Living people
Accrington Stanley F.C. players
Stockport County F.C. players
Colne F.C. players
Skelmersdale United F.C. players
Ramsbottom United F.C. players
Marine F.C. players
Glossop North End A.F.C. players
Trafford F.C. players
English Football League players
National League (English football) players
Northern Premier League players
Association football forwards
English footballers